The seventh edition of the Caribbean Series (Serie del Caribe) was played in 1955. It was held from February 10 through February 15, featuring the champion baseball teams from Cuba, Alacranes de Almendares; Panama, Carta Vieja Yankees; Puerto Rico, Cangrejeros de Santurce, and Venezuela, Navegantes del Magallanes. The format consisted of 12 games, each team facing the other teams twice. The games were played at Estadio Universitario in Caracas, the capital city of Venezuela, which boosted capacity to 22,690 seats, while the ceremonial first pitch was thrown by Marcos Pérez Jiménez, by then the President of Venezuela.

Summary
Puerto Rico won the Series with a 5–1 record en route for a third straight championship. The Cangrejeros club was managed by Herman Franks and led by the dynamic shortstop Don Zimmer, who posted a .400 batting average (8-for-20) with a .950 slugging and led the hitters with three home runs. Santurce also received a considerable support from outfielders Willie Mays (two HR, nine RBI, six runs, 885 SLG), Roberto Clemente (one HR, .577 SLG, seven runs) and Bob Thurman (.318). Also helping out were catcher Harry Chiti (.333, one HR, .667 SLG) and third baseman Buster Clarkson (.313). Bill Greason (2–0, 2.00 ERA), Sad Sam Jones (1–0, 1.50) and Rubén Gómez (1–0) led the pitching staff, while Zimmer claimed Most Valuable Player honors. Puerto Rico also had veteran OF Luis Rodríguez Olmo in addition to Tite Arroyo (P) and George Crowe (1B). Mays, after going 0-for-13 in the Series, hit a two-out, two-run walk-off homer in the 11th inning of Game 6. Then, he went 11-for-13 in the next three games to finish with a second-best average of .462 (12-for-26) and leading the series in RBI.

The Venezuelan team finished in second place with a 4–2 record and was managed by Lázaro Salazar. Magallanes was responsible for the only defeat suffered by Santurce, 7–2 in the closing game, and previously had been beaten by Cuba 1–0 in a pitching duel and by Puerto Rico, 4–2 in an extrainning game. It was the best performance by a Venezuelan team to that point. The offensive was led by part-time OF Pablo García, who hit .500 (6-for-12), including three runs, six RBI and a .917 SLG. Other contributions came from 2B Jack Lohrke (.348, four runs, .478 SLG), 1B Bob Skinner (.280. two HR, four RBI), RF George Wilson (.381, five RBI, .762 SLG), 3B Luis García (6-for-21, two runs, two RBI) and Chico Carrasquel (five runs, four RBI). José Bracho (2–0, 0.53 ERA) led a pitching staff that included Emilio Cueche (1–1, 2.00), Joe Margoneri (1–0, 2.00), Ramón Monzant (0–1, 3.27) and reliever Bill Kennedy (1–0), 0.00). Also in the roster were outfielders Bob Lennon (5-for-19) and Dalmiro Finol (2-for-13).

Guided by Bobby Bragan, Almendares finished 2–4 for the worst record ever by a Cuban team in the Series. A one-man offensive attack, 1B Rocky Nelson led the Series hitters with a .471 average (8-for-18) and collected a .647 SLG. Other support came from C Gus Triandos (.263, two HRs, seven RBI, .579 SLG). The starting staff was composed by Cholly Naranjo (1–0, 2.00 ERA), Joe Hatten (1–1, 3.00), Red Munger (0–1, 7.50) and Roger Bowman (0–1, 5.00). Other players for Cuba included Ps Lino Donoso, Al Lyons and Conrado Marrero; IFs Willy Miranda, Héctor Rodríguez and José Valdivielso, as well as OFs Román Mejías, Carlos Paula, Earl Rapp and Lee Walls.

For last place Panama, managed by Al Kubski, the top player was LF  Guilford Dickens, who batted .364 with a .682 SLG and hit both of the team's home runs. SP Humberto Robinson (1–0, 12 SO, 1.64 ERA) recorded the only victory for Carta Vieja, while Bill Harris and Ernie Lawrence both finished 0–2. Other players included Milt Graff (IF), John Fitzgerald (P), Fred Marolewski (IF) and Spider Wilhelm (IF)

Scoreboards

Game 1, February 10

Game 2, February 10

Game 3, February 11

Game 4, February 11

Game 5, February 12

Game 6, February 12

Game 7, February 13

Game 8, February 13

Game 9, February 14

Game 10, February 14

Game 11, February 15

Game 12, February 15

See also
Ballplayers who have played in the Series

Sources
Antero Núñez, José. Series del Caribe. Jefferson, Caracas, Venezuela: Impresos Urbina, C.A., 1987.
Gutiérrez, Daniel. Enciclopedia del Béisbol en Venezuela – 1895-2006 . Caracas, Venezuela: Impresión Arte, C.A., 2007.

External links
Official site
Latino Baseball
Series del Caribe, Las (Spanish)

Caribbean
Caribbean Series
International baseball competitions hosted by Venezuela
Sport in Caracas
1955 in Venezuelan sport
1955 in Caribbean sport
20th century in Caracas
Caribbean Series